Manish Makhija (sometimes spelled Munish Makhija, born 7 October 1968), is an Indian video jockey, and Mumbai-based restaurateur, who is most known for his characters Udham Singh on Channel V's The Udham Singh Show (1997), and Munna on UTV Bindass's Cash Cab – Meter Chalu Hai.

Early life and education 
Makhija was born and brought up in Delhi where his father and mother worked for the Indian Postal Department.

He received his B.A. political science degree from Delhi's Kirori Mal College. He subsequently studied for an L.L.B. at Delhi University, but dropped out.

Career 
He first made his mark and gained popularity with Channel V show, 'The Udham Singh Show', where he anchored the show as Udham Singh in Hariyanvi style. The show started as an offshoot of an ad campaign launched by the channel during the general elections in the late 1990s asking youngsters to cast their vote. Later a campaign to persuade watchers to vote for the Viewers' Choice Award, featured a caricature of a Haryanvi Jat election officer from Meham in Haryana, the show was soon a hit.

In 2003, he started working along Pooja Bhatt's in her directorial debut Paap (2004), he sourced two soundtracks from the Pakistani band, Junoon and Nusrat Fateh Ali Khan’s nephew Rahat Fateh Ali Khan, who sang Laagi Tumse Mann Ki Lagan for the film, he also did a small role in the film. Thereafter he appeared in small roles in films like Rog and Dhoka (2007), and he assisted her in Rog (2005). Thereafter he worked with Tehelka.com for a while, before moving to Goa, where he opened a lounge bar, The Other Side, at Morgem Beach in Goa.

Later in 2008, he also hosted a popular reality quiz show for UTV Bindass called Cash Cab – Meter Chalu Hai  

He has also featured in a feature film Luv Shuv Tey Chicken Khurana in the role of a local mafia in the UK.

Personal life 
He was earlier married to Neha Gupta. He later married Indian movie actress, producer and director, Pooja Bhatt, daughter of Mahesh Bhatt in August 2003, whom he had met a few months earlier, while working with her in her film, Paap (2004), where in also did a small role. In December, 2014 the couple decided to part ways after 11 years of marriage. The actress took to micro-blogging site Twitter to announce their decision. In a series of tweets, Pooja wrote, "To all those who care & especially those that don't my husband Munna & Me have decided to part ways after 11 glorious years of marriage. Our split as some might call it is amicable & we hold each other in the highest esteem for now and forever." He has since reunited with his family and is playing an active role in the life of his son.

Awards and nominations

References

External links 
 

Indian television presenters
1956 births
Living people
Kirori Mal College alumni
Businesspeople from Delhi
Indian restaurateurs
Delhi University alumni
Indian VJs (media personalities)